Wheelerville is an unincorporated community in northeastern Barry County, Missouri, United States. It is located at the intersection of Route 248 snd Route D, approximately eight miles west-northwest of Galena in adjacent Stone County.

Wheelerville's ZIP code is 65605.

References

Unincorporated communities in Barry County, Missouri
Unincorporated communities in Missouri